Darmstadt is a small, German-heritage town primarily located in Scott Township, Vanderburgh County, Indiana, United States.  It also extends slightly into Armstrong, Center and German townships. The population was 1,407 at the 2010 census. Darmstadt, located just north of Evansville, is the only other incorporated municipality in Vanderburgh County besides Evansville.

Geography
Darmstadt is located at  (38.091041, -87.576207).

Demographics

2010 census
As of the census of 2010, there were 1,407 people, 544 households, and 441 families living in the town. The racial makeup of the town was 97.5% White, 0.6% African American, 0.8% Asian, 0.1% Pacific Islander, 0.3% from other races, and 0.8% from two or more races. Hispanic or Latino of any race were 0.6% of the population.

There were 544 households, of which 30.1% had children under the age of 18 living with them, 72.2% were married couples living together, 5.5% had a female householder with no husband present, 3.3% had a male householder with no wife present, and 18.9% were non-families. 15.6% of all households were made up of individuals, and 7.5% had someone living alone who was 65 years of age or older. The average household size was 2.59 and the average family size was 2.88.

The median age in the town was 47.1 years. 21.3% of residents were under the age of 18; 6.1% were between the ages of 18 and 24; 18.8% were from 25 to 44; 36.6% were from 45 to 64; and 17% were 65 years of age or older. The gender makeup of the town was 51.5% male and 48.5% female.

2000 census
As of the census of 2000, there were 1,313 people, 490 households, and 605 families living in the town. The racial makeup of the town was 99.16% White, 0.23% African American, 0.15% Asian, and 0.46% from two or more races. Hispanic or Latino of any race were 0.08% of the population.

There were 490 households, out of which 34.3% had children under the age of 18 living with them, 76.3% were married couples living together, 4.3% had a female householder with no husband present, and 17.3% were non-families. 15.3% of all households were made up of individuals, and 9.4% had someone living alone who was 65 years of age or older. The average household size was 2.68 and the average family size was 2.97.

In the town, the population was spread out, with 25.5% under the age of 18, 5.3% from 18 to 24, 24.7% from 25 to 44, 29.0% from 45 to 64, and 15.5% who were 65 years of age or older. The median age was 43 years. For every 100 females, there were 98.3 males. For every 100 females age 18 and over, there were 98.4 males.

The median income for a household in the town was $68,359, and the median income for a family was $72,813. Males had a median income of $50,605 versus $28,750 for females. The per capita income for the town was $31,898. About 0.5% of families and 1.1% of the population were below the poverty line, including none of those under age 18 and 1.0% of those age 65 or over.

Transportation
Darmstadt is served by a number of different transportation methods. The major roads in Darmstadt include Darmstadt Road, Saint Joseph Avenue, and Boonville-New Harmony Road. Darmstadt Road and Saint Joseph Avenue provide direct access to Evansville, and Boonville-New Harmony Road runs directly by the shopping center, providing links to both Boonville and New Harmony.

U.S. 41 runs north-to-south directly east of Darmstadt, providing yet another access point to Evansville, as well as quick access to I-64.

Businesses
Businesses continue to flourish in Darmstadt, including the post office, the barber shop, the Darmstadt Inn, Bauerhaus and Gardo's Pizza. The Vanderburgh County 4H Center is also in Darmstadt, Indiana, and hosts many events—including the Frog Follies which is an antique car show that bring attendees into town from around the world.

See also
World Peace Tree, a historically significant tree in Darmstadt

References

External links
    Town of Darmstadt, Indiana website

German-American culture in Indiana
Towns in Vanderburgh County, Indiana
Towns in Indiana
Populated places established in 1822
Communities of Southwestern Indiana
Evansville metropolitan area
1822 establishments in Indiana